The Nanook River (meaning "polar bear") is located on Victoria Island in Northern Canada, commencing in the Northwest Territories and ending in Nunavut.

The Nanook River originates in the island's central plain, south of the Shaler Mountains. about two hours by Twin Otter north of Cambridge Bay.

The river flows east, passes through a rapid, and then enters Namaycush Lake. The final  include several uncharted rapids before the river's mouth reaches Hadley Bay, emptying into Viscount Melville Sound.

No glaciers feed the river. Lousewort, Arctic poppy, aven, sedge, willow thickets are found along the river. Arctic fox, lemming, muskox, snowy owl, Peary caribou frequent the river, and polar bears are common at its mouth.

See also
List of rivers of the Northwest Territories
List of rivers of Nunavut

References

Rivers of Kitikmeot Region
Rivers of the Northwest Territories
Victoria Island (Canada)
Rivers of Nunavut